White Oak Township (also designated Township 20) is one of twenty townships within Wake County, North Carolina,  United States. As of the 2010 census, White Oak Township had a population of 72,894, an 88.3% increase over 2000.

White Oak Township, occupying  in western Wake County, includes the bulk of the town of Apex and portions of the town of Cary.

References

Populated places in Wake County, North Carolina
Townships in Wake County, North Carolina